Dragutin "Dragiša" Lapčević (27 October 1867 – 14 August 1939) was a Serbian politician, journalist, and historian. He was one of the founders, alongside Dimitrije Tucović, of the Serbian Social Democratic Party (existed 1903–1918), that supported a Balkan Federation during the Kingdom of Serbia.

Life
Dragiša was born in Užice in 1867. The family moved to Požega when Lapčević was the age of three or four. There he completed his grammar school education, after which he continued to educate himself by attending lectures in political science and economics and reading smuggled socialist material into the Kingdom of Serbia at a time when Anti-Socialist Laws were instituted. Initially, he worked as an unskilled laborer, first in a bakery and in a mechanic shop. Later, he was appointed as a municipal clerk. There he gained a reputation as a brilliant public speaker and was elected as municipal opposition president in 1893, but the Serbian government annulled it. Influenced by Svetozar Marković,  he supported the ideas of Karl Kautsky and opposed those of Georgi Plekhanov.

He was considered the most important Serbian theoretician of the Marxist labour movement after the death of its founders, and it may well be said that he was its most representative member as an anti-Bolshevik. In him were very clearly incorporated both the revolutionary and the reactionary aspects of that movement.

In polemics with the left wing of the party, headed by Dimitrije Tucović, Lapčević often adopted centrist and right-opportunist positions. From 1905 to 1908 and again from 1912 to 1919, he was a deputy in the Skupština (Assembly), where he won a great international  reputation by voting against war budgets ahead of the Balkan Wars of 1912–13 and World War I, advocating a Balkan Federation. In the post-war period, he refused to join the Bolsheviks. He was an opponent of Bolshevik influence in the workers' movement of the then Yugoslavia. From 20 to 23 April 1919, delegates from Social democratic parties of Serbia, Bosnia-Hercegovina, Vojvodina, Montenegro, Croatia-Slavonia and Macedonia met to found the Socialist Workers' Party of Yugoslavia which immediately joined the Communist International against the advice of Lapčević. At the organization's Second Congress held in Vukovar from 20 to 24 June 1920, the less radically inclined centrist faction led by Dragiša Lapčević and Žarko Topalović was expelled. In 1921 Dragiša Lapčević was one of the organizers of the reformist Socialist Party of Yugoslavia. In the early 1920s, Lapčević left politics and withdrew from the workers' movement, not wanting to take further part in the polemics of the opposing parties.

He was the author of many works on ethnology and the history of the economy and the workers’ movement in Serbia, among them The History of Socialism in Serbia (1922). He was a staunch opposer of Greater Serbia.

Major works
 Istorija socijalizma u Srbiji (History of Socialism in Serbia, 1922)
 Rat i srpska socijalna demokratija (War and Serbian Social Democracy, 1925)
 Položaj radničke klase u Srbiji (Position of the Working Class in Serbia, 1928)

References

External links
 Dragisa Lapcevic
 

1867 births
1939 deaths
Writers from Užice
Politicians from Užice
Serbian journalists
20th-century Serbian historians
Serbian people of World War I
Serbian Marxists
Serbian socialists
Socialism in the Kingdom of Serbia
Socialism in the Kingdom of Yugoslavia